His Greatest Hits is a compilation album by Elvis Presley, released in 1983.

Track listing

Heartbreak Hotel/Elvis's Greatest Hits-1956
 "Heartbreak Hotel"
 "Don't Be Cruel"
 "I Want You, I Need You, I Love You"
 "Blue Suede Shoes (Lil Vinh)"
 "Any Way You Want Me (Armin Tekashi)"
 "Hound Dog"

Love Me Tender/Elvis's Greatest Hits-1956-57
 "Love Me Tender"
 "Too Much"
 "Love Me"
 "I Was the One"
 "Playing For Keeps"
 "(Let Me Be Your) Teddy Bear"

Jailhouse Rock/Elvis's Greatest Hits-1957
 "All Shook Up"
 "Loving You"
 "Treat Me Nice"
 "Blue Christmas"
 "That's When Your Heartaches Begin"
 "Jailhouse Rock"

Hard Headed Woman/Elvis's Greatest Hits-1958
 "Don't"
 "I Beg of You"
 "Wear My Ring Around Your Neck"
 "One Night"
 "King Creole"
 "Hard Headed Woman"

A Big Hunk O'Love/Elvis's Greatest Hits-1958-59
 "I Got Stung"
 "A Fool Such As I"
 "I Need Your Love Tonight"
 "My Wish Came True"
 "Doncha' Think It's Time"
 "A Big Hunk O'Love"

Stuck On You/Elvis's Greatest Hits-1960
 "Are You Lonesome Tonight?"
 "Stuck On You"
 "I Gotta Know"
 "Fame and Fortune"
 "A Mess o'Blues"
 "It's Now or Never"

Surrender/Elvis's Greatest Hits-1961
 "Can't Help Falling In Love"
 "Surrender"
 "Little Sister"
 "Flaming Star"
 "I Feel So Bad"
 "His Latest Flame"

Return to Sender/Elvis's Greatest Hits-1961-62
 "Return to Sender"
 "Good Luck Charm"
 "Follow That Dream"
 "Wooden Heart"
 "She's Not You"
 "Rock-a-Hula Baby"

Bossa Nova Baby/Elvis's Greatest Hits-1962-64
 "Blue Hawaii"
 "You're the Devil In Disguise"
 "One Broken Heart For Sale"
 "Bossa Nova Baby"
 "Such a Night"

Kissin' Cousins/Elvis's Greatest Hits-1964
 "Kissin' Cousins"
 "Ask Me"
 "Ain't That Loving You Baby"
 "Viva Las Vegas"
 "Kiss Me Quick"
 "What'd I Say"

In the Ghetto/Elvis's Greatest Hits-1965-69
 "Suspicious Minds"
 "In the Ghetto"
 "(Such An) Easy Question"
 "Don't Cry Daddy"
 "If I Can Dream"
 "Puppet on a String"

Burning Love/Elvis's Greatest Hits from the 70s
 "You Don't Have to Say You Love Me"
 "Burning Love"
 "The Wonder of You"
 "Steamroller Blues"
 "Kentucky Rain"
 "My Way"

Mystery Train/Early Elvis-1954-55
 "Mystery Train"
 "I'm Left, You're Right, She's Gone"
 "I Forgot to Remember to Forget"
 "Baby, Let's Play House"
 "That's All Right"
 "You're a Heartbreaker"

I Really Don't Want to Know/Country classics
 "Your Cheatin' Heart"
 "I Really Don't Want to Know"
 "When My Blue Moon Turns to Gold Again"
 "There Goes My Everything"
 "Have I Told You Lately That I Love You"
 "I Can't Stop Loving You"

References

1983 greatest hits albums
Elvis Presley compilation albums
Compilation albums published posthumously